Negation in Arabic ( 'the negative') is the array of approaches used in Arabic grammar to express grammatical negation. These strategies correspond to words in English like no and not.

Modern Standard Arabic

Negation in the present tense

Negating present-tense verbs 

Present-tense verbs are negated by adding   "not" before the verb:

Negation of sentences with no verb 

If a sentence would, in the affirmative, have no verb (this can only happen in the present tense), then the negative verb   "is not" is used.  is inflected like a past-tense verb, but is used to negate present-tense sentences. As with   "was", the complement of  must be in the accusative case. Before consonantal endings, the diphthong -ay- is reduced to a short -a-.

Here is an example sentence saying that something is not big in all possible persons and numbers:

Negation of past-tense verbs 

In Modern Standard Arabic, the main way to negate past-tense verbs is to add the negative particle   "not" before the verb, and to put the verb in the jussive mood. In more colloquial usage, it is possible to give the verb in the present indicative mood (which is largely identical in form to the jussive).

It is also possible to use the negative particle   before the verb, giving the verb in the past tense.

Negation of verbs in the future tense 
Negating a proposition in the future is done by placing the negative particle   before the verb in the subjunctive mood.

Negation of imperative verbs 

The imperative (known as  "the order," from  "he ordered") is negated by putting   "not" before the verb, putting the verb in the jussive, rather than the imperative, mood. (This negative imperative is known as  "the discouragement," from  "he discouraged.") For example, in the masculine singular:  (iẓlim, "oppress!"),  (lā taẓlim, "do not oppress!").

Saying "no" 

"No", as an answer to a question, is expressed by the negative particle  .

Varieties of Arabic 

Modern Standard Arabic   "is not" is replaced in colloquial usage with a variety of other forms, which in origin are contractions of phrases such as ما مِنْ شَيْ mā min shay "nothing" (literally: "none from/of a thing"):

North African, Egyptian, and some Levantine Arabic varieties negate verbs using a circumfix—a combination of the prefix ma- and the suffix -ʃ. This, for example, is the negative paradigm of the verb   "he wrote" in Algerian Arabic:

In these varieties, to negate present participles and verbs conjugated in the future, mūš, or its conjugated form, is frequently used (in front of the verb). For example, Tunisian Arabic   is conjugated as follows:

See also 

 Illa (Arabic)

References 

Arabic grammar